An outstation is a subsidiary establishment of some kind at a distance from the main establishment. It may also refer to:

Outstation (Aboriginal community), Australia
Outstation (aviation), an airport that is not a hub, focus city, nor base of an air carrier
Outstation (Australian agriculture), a subsidiary homestead on a large cattle or sheep station, Australia
Outstation (bus), bus storage depot, UK
Outstation (church), a newly-formed congregation managed by the nearest parish priest, mostly in Africa

See also
RAF Eastcote, also known as Eastcote Outstation